The Sexual Offences (Northern Ireland) Order 2008 provides a legislative framework for sexual offences in Northern Ireland. The corresponding legislation in England and Wales and in Scotland are the Sexual Offences Act 2003 and the Sexual Offences (Scotland) Act 2009. The Sexual Offences (Northern Ireland) Order 2008 defines several sexual offenses, including rape.

See also
Sexual Offences Act
Sexual offences in the United Kingdom

References

2008 in Northern Ireland
2008 in British law
Criminal law of Northern Ireland
Sex laws
Sexual harassment in the United Kingdom